Iliass Bel Hassani (born 16 September 1992) is a Moroccan professional footballer who plays as an attacking midfielder for RKC Waalwijk.

Club career
Born in Rotterdam, Bel Hassani made his professional debut for hometown club Sparta in August 2010 against RBC and was rewarded with the Gouden Stier (Golden Bull) Award for the most promising player in the Eerste Divisie in May 2012. In his time at the club he scored 16 goals in 75 matches.

In September 2013, he signed a three-year contract with the option of a fourth with Heracles. He had his first taste of European football playing in the 2016–17 UEFA Europa League for Heracles against Portuguese side Arouca.

In late August 2016, he joined AZ on a five-year contract until 2021.

On 24 December 2018, it was announced that Bel Hassani would join FC Groningen on a loan spell until the end of the season. He signed for PEC Zwolle in July 2019.

On 28 January 2020, Al-Wakrah signed Bel Hassani for one season from PEC Zwolle.

On 1 July 2021, it was announced that Bel Hassani had signed with RKC Waalwijk on a one-year contract, coming over from Emirati club Ajman, where he had spent the previous six months.

International career
Bel Hassani was born in the Netherlands to parents of Moroccan descent. He debuted for the Morocco U23 national team in a 4–3 loss to the Mexico U23.

Career statistics

References

External links
 
 Voetbal International profile 

1992 births
Living people
Association football midfielders
Footballers from Rotterdam
Moroccan footballers
Moroccan expatriate footballers
Morocco youth international footballers
Dutch footballers
Dutch expatriate footballers
Dutch sportspeople of Moroccan descent
Sparta Rotterdam players
Heracles Almelo players
AZ Alkmaar players
Jong AZ players
FC Groningen players
PEC Zwolle players
Al-Wakrah SC players
Ajman Club players
RKC Waalwijk players
Eredivisie players
Eerste Divisie players
Qatar Stars League players
UAE Pro League players
Expatriate footballers in Qatar
Moroccan expatriate sportspeople in Qatar
Expatriate footballers in the United Arab Emirates
Moroccan expatriate sportspeople in the United Arab Emirates